A forklift (also called a lift truck, jitney, hi-lo, fork truck, fork hoist, and forklift truck) is a powered industrial truck used to lift and move materials over short distances. The forklift was developed in the early 20th century by various companies, including Clark, which made transmissions, and Yale & Towne Manufacturing, which made hoists. Since World War II, the use and development of the forklift truck have greatly expanded worldwide. Forklifts have become an indispensable piece of equipment in manufacturing and warehousing. In 2013, the top 20 manufacturers worldwide posted sales of $30.4 billion, with 944,405 machines sold.

History

The middle nineteenth century through the early 20th century saw the developments that led to today's modern forklifts. The forerunners of the modern forklift were manually-powered hoists that were used to lift loads. In 1906, the Pennsylvania Railroad introduced battery-powered platform trucks for moving luggage at their Altoona, Pennsylvania, train station. World War I saw the development of different types of material-handling equipment in the United Kingdom by Ransomes, Sims & Jefferies of Ipswich.  This was in part due to the labor shortages caused by the war. In 1917, Clark in the United States began developing and using powered tractor and powered lift tractors in their factories. In 1919, the Towmotor Company, and Yale & Towne Manufacturing in 1920, entered the lift truck market in the United States. Continuing development and expanded use of the forklift continued through the 1920s and 1930s. The introduction of hydraulic power and the development of the first electric power forklifts, along with the use of standardized pallets in the late 1930s, helped to increase the popularity of forklift trucks.

The start of World War II, like World War I before, spurred the use of forklift trucks in the war effort. Following the war, more efficient methods for storing products in warehouses were being implemented. Warehouses needed more maneuverable forklift trucks that could reach greater heights and new forklift models were made that filled this need. For example, in 1954, a British company named Lansing Bagnall, now part of KION Group, developed what was claimed to be the first narrow-aisle electric-reach truck. The development changed the design of warehouses leading to narrower aisles and higher load-stacking that increased storage capability. During the 1950s and 1960s, operator safety became a concern due to the increasing lifting heights and capacities. Safety features such as load backrests and operator cages, called overhead guards, began to be added to forklifts produced in this era. In the late 1980s, ergonomic design began to be incorporated in new forklift designs to improve operator comfort, reduce injuries and increase productivity. During the 1990s, exhaust emissions from forklift operations began to be addressed which led to emission standards being implemented for forklift manufacturers in various countries. The introduction of AC power forklifts, along with fuel cell technology, are also refinements in continuing forklift development.

General operations

Forklifts are rated for loads at a specified maximum weight and a specified forward center of gravity.  This information is located on a nameplate provided by the manufacturer, and loads must not exceed these specifications. In many jurisdictions, it is illegal to alter or remove the nameplate without the permission of the forklift manufacturer.

An important aspect of forklift operation is that it must have rear-wheel steering. While this increases maneuverability in tight cornering situations, it differs from a driver’s traditional experience with other wheeled vehicles. While steering, as there is no caster action, it is unnecessary to apply steering force to maintain a constant rate of turn.

Another critical characteristic of the forklift is its instability. The forklift and load must be considered a unit with a continually varying center of gravity with every movement of the load. A forklift must never negotiate a turn at speed with a raised load, where centrifugal and gravitational forces may combine to cause a tip-over accident. The forklift is designed with a load limit for the forks which is decreased with fork elevation and undercutting of the load (i.e., when a load does not butt against the fork "L"). A loading plate for loading reference is usually located on the forklift. A forklift should not be used as a personnel lift without the fitting of specific safety equipment, such as a "cherry picker" or "cage".

Forklifts are a critical element of warehouses and distribution centers. It is considered imperative that these structures be designed to accommodate their efficient and safe movement. In the case of Drive-In/Drive-Thru Racking, a forklift needs to travel inside a storage bay that is multiple pallet positions deep to place or retrieve a pallet. Often, forklift drivers are guided into the bay by guide rails on the floor and the pallet is placed on cantilevered arms or rails. These maneuvers require well-trained operators. Since every pallet requires the truck to enter the storage structure, damage is more common than with other types of storage. In designing a drive-in system, dimensions of the fork truck, including overall width and mast width, must be carefully considered.

Forklift control and capabilities
Forklift hydraulics are controlled either with levers directly manipulating the hydraulic valves or by electrically controlled actuators, using smaller "finger" levers for control. The latter allows forklift designers more freedom in ergonomic design.

Forklift trucks are available in many variations and load capacities.  In a typical warehouse setting, most forklifts have load capacities between one and five tons. Larger machines, up to 50 tons lift capacity, are used for lifting heavier loads, including loaded shipping containers.

In addition to a control to raise and lower the forks (also known as blades or tines), the operator can tilt the mast to compensate for a load's tendency to angle the blades toward the ground and risk slipping off the forks. Tilt also provides a limited ability to operate on non-level ground. Skilled forklift operators annually compete in obstacle and timed challenges at regional forklift rodeos.

Design types

Low lift truck 
Powered pallet truck, usually electrically powered. Low lift trucks may be operated by a person seated on the machine, or by a person walking alongside, depending on the design.

Stacker 

Usually electrically powered. A stacker may be operated by a person seated on the machine, or by a person walking alongside, depending on the design.

Reach truck 
Variant on a Rider Stacker forklift, designed for small aisles. They are usually electrically powered. A reach truck's forks can extend to reach the load, hence the name. There are two variants: moving carriage, which is common in North America; and moving mast, which is common in the rest of the world, and generally regarded as safer.

Counterbalanced forklift 
.
Standard forklifts use a counterweight at the rear of the truck to offset, or counterbalance, the weight of a load carried at the front of the truck. Electric-powered forklifts utilise the weight of the battery as a counterweight and are typically smaller in size as a result.

Sideloader 
A sideloader is a piece of materials-handling equipment designed for long loads. The operator’s cab is positioned up front on the left-hand side. The area to the right of the cab is called the bed or platform. This contains a central section within it, called the well, where the forks are positioned. The mast and forks reach out to lift the load at its central point and lower it onto the bed. Driving forwards with a load carried lengthways allows long goods, typically timber, steel, concrete or plastics, to be moved through doorways and stored more easily than via conventional forklift trucks.

Order-picking truck 
Similar to a reach truck, except the operator either rides in a cage welded to the fork carriage or walks alongside, dependent on design. If the operator is riding in the order picking truck, they wear a specially-designed safety harness to prevent falls. A special toothed grab holds the pallet to the forks. The operator transfers the load onto the pallet one article at a time by hand. This is an efficient way of picking less-than-pallet-load shipments and is popular for use in large distribution centers.

Guided very-narrow-aisle truck 
A counterbalance-type sit-down rider electric forklift fitted with a specialized mast assembly. The mast is capable of rotating 90 degrees, and the forks can then advance like on a reach mechanism, to pick up full pallets. Because the forklift does not have to turn, the aisles can be exceptionally narrow, and if wire guidance is fitted in the floor of the building the machine can almost work on its own. Masts on this type of machine tend to be very high. The higher the racking that can be installed, the higher the density the storage can reach. This sort of storage system is popular in cities where land prices are very high, as by building the racking up to three times higher than normal and using these machines, it is possible to stock a much larger amount of material in a building with a relatively small surface area.

Guided very-narrow-aisle order picking truck 
Counterbalance-type order-picking truck similar to the guided very-narrow-aisle truck, except that the operator and the controls which operate the machine are in a cage welded to the mast. The operator wears a restraint system to protect them against falls. Otherwise, the description is the same as guided very-narrow-aisle truck.

Truck-mounted forklift 
Also referred to as a sod loader. Comes in sit-down center control. Usually has an internal combustion engine. Engines are almost always diesel, but sometimes operate on kerosene, and sometimes use propane injection as a power boost. Some old units are two-stroke compression ignition; most are four-stroke compression ignition. North American engines come with advanced emission control systems. Forklifts built in countries such as Iran or Russia will typically have no emission control systems.

Specialized trucks

At the other end of the spectrum from the counterbalanced forklift trucks are more 'high-end' specialty trucks

Articulated counterbalance trucks 
Articulating counterbalance trucks are designed to be both able to offload trailers and place the load in narrow aisle racking. The central pivot of the truck allows loads to be stored in racking at a right angle to the truck, reducing space requirements (therefore increasing pallet storage density) and eliminating double handling from yard to warehouse.

Frederick L Brown is credited with perfecting the principle of an articulated design in about 1982, receiving an award in 2002 from the UK's Fork Lift Truck Association for Services to the Forklift Industry and the Queen’s Award for Innovation in 2003. He took inspiration from the hand pallet truck and found that by reversing the triangle of stability and changing the weight distribution he could solve the issues that had long eluded earlier attempts of articulating a forklift truck. Freddy's patent application referenced specific drive methods, allowing competitors to enter the market by offering alternative methods, but using the same articulating principle.

Guided very narrow aisle trucks 
These are rail- or wire-guided and available with lift heights up to 40 feet non-top-tied and 98 feet top-tied.  Two forms are available: 'man-down' and 'man-riser', where the operator elevates with the load for increased visibility or for multilevel 'break bulk' order picking.  This type of truck, unlike articulated narrow-aisle trucks, requires a high standard of floor flatness.

Marina forklifts 
These lifts are found in places like marinas and boat storage facilities. Featuring tall masts, heavy counterweights, and special paint to resist seawater-induced corrosion, they are used to lift boats in and out of storage racks. Once out, the forklift can place the boat into the water, as well as remove it when the boating activity is finished. Marina forklifts are unique among most other forklifts in that they feature a "negative lift" cylinder. This type of cylinder allows the forks to actually descend lower than ground level. Such functionality is necessary, given that the ground upon which the forklift operates is higher than the water level below. Additionally, marina forklifts feature some of the longest forks available, with some up to 24 feet long. The forks are also typically coated in rubber to prevent damage to the hull of the boats that rest on them.

Omnidirectional trucks 
Omnidirectional technology (such as Mecanum wheels) can allow a forklift truck to move forward, diagonally and laterally, or in any direction on a surface. An omnidirectional wheel system is able to rotate the truck 360 degrees in its own footprint or strafe sideways without turning the truck cabin.

UL 558 safety-rated trucks 
In North America, some internal combustion-powered industrial vehicles carry Underwriters Laboratories ratings that are part of UL 558. Industrial trucks that are considered "safety" carry the designations GS (Gasoline Safety) for gasoline-powered, DS (Diesel Safety) for diesel-powered, LPS (Liquid Propane Safety) for liquified propane or GS/LPS for a dual fuel gasoline/liquified propane-powered truck.

UL 558 is a two-stage safety standard. The basic standards are referred to as G, D, LP, and G/LP. They are considered by Underwriters Laboratories to be the bare minimum required for a lift truck. This is a voluntary standard, and there is no requirement in North America at least by any Government Agency for manufacturers to meet this standard.

The slightly more stringent safety standards GS, DS, LPS, and GP/LPS do provide some minimal protection; however, it is extremely minimal. In the past, Underwriter's Laboratory offered specialty EX and DX safety certifications.

UL 583 safety-rated trucks 
UL 583 is the Electric equivalent of UL 558. As with UL 558 it is a two-stage standard.

Explosion-proof trucks 
These are for operation in potentially explosive atmospheres found in chemical, petrochemical, pharmaceutical, food and drink, logistics or other fields handling flammable material. Commonly referred to as Pyroban trucks in Europe, they must meet the requirements of the ATEX 94/9/EC Directive if used in Zone 1, 2, 21 or 22 areas and be maintained accordingly.

Automated forklift trucks
In order to decrease work wages, reduce operational cost and improve productivity, automated forklifts have also been developed. Automated forklifts are also called forked automated guided vehicles and are already available for sale.

Methods of propulsion

Internal combustion
Engines may be diesel, kerosene, gasoline, natural gas, butane, or propane-fueled, and may be either two-stroke spark ignition, four-stroke spark ignition (common), two-stroke compression ignition, and four-stroke compression ignition (common). North American Engines come with advanced emission control systems. Forklifts built in countries such as Iran or Russia will typically have no emission control systems.

Liquefied petroleum gas (LPG) 
These forklifts use an internal combustion engine modified to run on LPG. The fuel is often stored in a gas cylinder mounted to the rear of the truck. This allows for quick changing of the cylinder once the LPG runs out. LPG trucks are quieter than their diesel counterparts, while offering similar levels of performance.

Battery-electric 
Powered by lead-acid batteries or, increasingly, lithium-ion batteries; battery-electric types include: cushion-tire forklifts, scissor lifts, order pickers, stackers, reach trucks and pallet jacks. Electric forklifts are primarily used indoors on flat, even surfaces. Batteries prevent the emission of harmful fumes and are recommended for indoor facilities, such as food-processing and healthcare sectors.

Hydrogen fuel cell

Hydrogen fuel cell forklifts are powered by a chemical reaction between hydrogen and oxygen. The reaction is used to generate electricity which can then be stored in a battery and subsequently used to drive electric motors to power the forklift. This method of propulsion produces no local emissions, can be refueled in three minutes, and is often used in refrigerated warehouses as its performance is not degraded by lower temperatures.

Counterbalanced forklift components
A typical counterbalanced forklift contains the following components:
 
 Truck framethe base of the machine to which the mast, axles, wheels, counterweight, overhead guard and power source are attached. The frame may have fuel and hydraulic fluid tanks constructed as part of the frame assembly.
 Counterweighta mass attached to the rear of the forklift truck frame. The purpose of the counterweight is to counterbalance the load being lifted. In an electric forklift, the large battery may serve as part of the counterweight.
 Cabthe area that contains a seat for the operator along with the control pedals, steering wheel, levers, switches and a dashboard containing operator readouts. The cab area may be open-air or enclosed, but it is covered by the cage-like overhead guard assembly. When enclosed, the cab may also be equipped with a cab heater for cold climate countries along with a fan or air conditioning for hot weather.
 Overhead guarda metal roof supported by posts at each corner of the cab that helps protect the operator from any falling objects. On some forklifts, the overhead guard is an integrated part of the frame assembly.
 Power sourcemay consist of an internal combustion engine that can be powered by LP gas, CNG, gasoline or diesel fuel. Electric forklifts are powered by either a battery or fuel cell that provides power to the electric motors; some fuel cell forklifts may be powered by multiple fuel cells at once. For warehouses and other indoor applications, electric forklifts have the advantage of not producing carbon monoxide. 
 Tilt cylindershydraulic cylinders that are mounted to the truck frame and the mast. The tilt cylinders pivot the mast backwards or forwards to assist in engaging a load.
 Mastthe vertical assembly that does the work of raising and lowering the load. It is made up of interlocking rails that also provide lateral stability. The interlocking rails may either have rollers or bushings as guides. The mast is driven hydraulically, and operated by one or more hydraulic cylinders directly or using chains from the cylinder or cylinders. It may be mounted to the front axle or the frame of the forklift. A 'container mast' variation allows the forks to raise a few meters without increasing the total height of the forklift. This is useful when double-loading pallets into a container or under a mezzanine floor.
 Carriagethe component to which the forks or other attachments mount. It is mounted into and moves up and down the mast rails by means of chains or by being directly attached to the hydraulic cylinder. Like the mast, the carriage may have either rollers or bushings to guide it in the interlocking mast rails.
 Load backresta rack-like extension that is either bolted or welded to the carriage in order to prevent the load from shifting backward when the carriage is lifted to full height.
 Attachmentsmay consist of a mechanism that is attached to the carriage, either permanently or temporarily, to help in the proper engagement of the load. A variety of material-handling attachments are available. Some attachments include sideshifters, slipsheet attachments, carton clamps, multipurpose clamps, rotators, fork positioners, carpet poles, pole handlers, container handlers and roll clamps.
 Tireseither solid for indoor use, or pneumatic for outside use.

Attachments
Below is a list of common forklift attachments:

 Dimensioning devicesfork truck-mounted dimensioning systems provide dimensions for the cargo to facilitate truck-trailer space utilization and to support warehouse automation systems. The systems normally communicate the dimensions via 802.11 radios. NTEP-certified dimensioning devices are available to support commercial activities that bill based on volume.
 Sideshiftera hydraulic attachment that allows the operator to move the tines (forks) and backrest laterally. This allows easier placement of a load without having to reposition the truck.
 Rotatorto aid the handling of skids that may have become excessively tilted, and for other specialty material-handling needs, some forklifts are fitted with an attachment that allows the tines to be rotated. This type of attachment may also be used for dumping containers for quick unloading.
 Fork positionera hydraulic attachment that moves the tines (forks) together or apart. This removes the need for the operator to manually adjust the tines for different-sized loads.
 Roll and barrel clamp attachmenta mechanical or hydraulic attachment used to squeeze the item to be moved. It is used for handling barrels, kegs, or paper rolls. This type of attachment may also have a rotate function. The rotate function would help an operator to insert a vertically-stored paper into the horizontal intake of a printing press for example.
 Pole attachmentsin some locations, such as carpet warehouses, a long metal pole is used instead of forks to lift carpet rolls. Similar devices, though much larger, are used to pick up metal coils.
 Carton and multipurpose clamp attachmentshydraulic attachments that allow the operator to open and close around a load, squeezing it to pick it up. Products like cartons, boxes and bales can be moved with this type of attachment. With these attachments in use, the forklift truck is sometimes referred to as a clamp truck.
 Slip sheet attachment (push-pull)a hydraulic attachment that reaches forward, clamps onto a slip sheet and draws the slip sheet onto wide and thin metal forks for transport. The attachment will push the slip sheet and load off the forks for placement.
 Drum handler attachmenta mechanical attachment that slides onto the tines (forks). It usually has a spring-loaded jaw that grips the top lip edge of a drum for transport. Another type grabs around the drum in a manner similar to the roll or barrel attachments.
 Man basketa lift platform that slides onto the tines (forks) and is meant for hoisting workers. The man basket has railings to keep the person from falling and brackets for attaching a safety harness. Also, a strap or chain is used to attach the man basket to the carriage of the forklift.
 Telescopic forkshydraulic attachments that allow the forklift to operate in warehouses designed for "double-deep stacking", which means that two pallet shelves are placed behind each other without any aisle between them.
 Scalesfork truck-mounted scales enable operators to efficiently weigh the pallets they handle without interrupting their workflow by travelling to a platform scale. Scales are available that provide legal-for-trade weights for operations that involve billing by weight. They are easily retrofitted to the truck by hanging on the carriage in the same manner as forks hang on the truck.
 Single-double forksforks that in the closed position allow movement of a single pallet or platform but when separated, turn into a set of double forks that allow carrying two pallets side by side. The fork control may have to replace the side-shifter on some lift trucks.
 Snow plougha mechanical attachment that allows the forklift operator to easily and quickly move snow. The snow plough can often also be utilised at other times of the year as an attachment to clean up workplaces.
 Skipsa mechanical attachment that is fitted to the forklift to allow safe and speedy removal of waste to the appropriate skip or waste compactor. There are two types of skips: the roll-forward type and the bottom-emptying type.

Any attachment on a forklift will reduce its nominal load rating, which is computed with a stock fork carriage and forks. The actual load rating may be significantly lower.

Replacing or adding attachments

It is possible to replace an existing attachment or add one to a lift that does not already have one. Considerations include forklift type, capacity, carriage type, and number of hydraulic functions (that power the attachment features). As mentioned in the preceding section, replacing or adding an attachment may reduce (down-rate) the safe lifting capacity of the forklift truck (See also General operations, below).

Forklift attachment manufacturers offer online calculators to estimate the safe lifting capacity when using a particular attachment. However, only the forklift truck manufacturer can give accurate lifting capacities. Forklifts can be re-rated by the manufacturer and have a new specification plate attached to indicate the changed load capacity with the attachment in use.

In the context of attachment, a hydraulic function consists of a valve on the forklift with a lever near the operator that provides two passages of pressurized hydraulic oil to power the attachment features. Sometimes an attachment has more features than the forklift has hydraulic functions and one or more need to be added. There are many ways of adding hydraulic functions (also known as adding a valve). Forklift manufacturers make valves and hose routing accessories, but the parts and labor to install can be prohibitively expensive. Other ways include adding a solenoid valve in conjunction with a hose or cable reel that diverts oil flow from an existing function. However, hose and cable reels can block the operator's view and are easily damaged.

Lift truck associations and organizations
There are many national as well as continental associations related to the industrial truck sector. Some of the major organizations include:
 Industrial Truck Association (ITA) (North America)
 Material Handling Equipment Distributors Association (MHEDA) (North America)
  Fédération Européenne de la Manutention – European Federation of Materials Handling (FEM)
  Fork Lift Truck Association (FLTA) (UK)
  British Industrial Truck Association (BITA)
  Japan Industrial Vehicles Association (JIVA)
 Korean Construction Equipment Manufacturers Association (KOCEMA)

There are many significant contacts among these organizations and they have established joint statistical and engineering programs. One program is the World Industrial Trucks Statistics (WITS) which is published every month to the association memberships. The statistics are separated by area (continent), country and class of machine. While the statistics are generic and do not count production from most of the smaller manufacturers, the information is significant for its depth. These contacts have brought to a common definition of a Class System to which all the major manufacturers adhere.

Forklift safety

Standards
Forklift safety is subject to a variety of standards worldwide. The most important standard is the ANSI B56—of which stewardship has now been passed from the American National Standards Institute (ANSI) to the Industrial Truck Standards Development Foundation (ITSDF) after multi-year negotiations. ITSDF is a non-profit organization whose only purpose is the promulgation and modernization of the B56 standard.

Other forklift safety standards have been implemented in the United States by the Occupational Safety and Health Administration (OSHA) and in the United Kingdom by the Health and Safety Executive.

Driver safety
In many countries, forklift truck operators must be trained and certified to operate forklift trucks. Certification may be required for each individual class of lift that an operator would use.

Forklift training has many names, such as forklift licensing or forklift certification. Whichever term is used, training must adhere to federal or national standards.

Health care providers do not recommend that workers who drive or use heavy equipment such as forklifts treat chronic or acute pain with opioids.

Drivers are recommended to use a spotter if placing a large load that obstructs their view while driving forwards.

Forklift training in the United States
In the United States, workplace forklift training is governed federally by the Occupational Safety and Health Administration (OSHA).  In 1999, OSHA updated its 29 CFR 1910.178 regulations governing "Powered Industrial Trucks" (the term OSHA uses to include forklifts among other types of industrial vehicles). A major component of these regulations deals with forklift operator training. The standard requires employers to develop and implement a training program based on the general principles of safe truck operation, the types of vehicle(s) being used in the workplace, the hazards of the workplace created by the use of the vehicle(s), and the general safety requirements of the OSHA standard. OSHA believes that trained operators must know how to do the job properly and do it safely as demonstrated by workplace evaluation. Formal (lecture, video, etc.) and practical (demonstration and practical exercises) training must be provided. Employers must also certify that each operator has received the training and evaluate each operator at least once every three years. Prior to operating the truck in the workplace, the employer must evaluate the operator's performance and determine the operator to be competent to operate a powered industrial truck safely. Refresher training is needed whenever an operator demonstrates a deficiency in the safe operation of the truck.

Forklift training in the United Kingdom
In the UK, the Provision and Use of Work Equipment Regulations state that operators of forklift trucks must be adequately trained; the general standards of that training and good operating practice are found in the HSE Code of Practice 117 (Third edition) issued in 2013. Third-party organisations have developed de facto 'best practice' standards for forklift training, commonly referred to in the UK as a 'forklift licence'; these are no longer recognised as proof of training as defined in the COP 117 (third edition) and as such training is not a legal requirement as is commonly believed. Organised training however helps to demonstrate that an employer has taken steps to ensure its 'duty of care' in the event of an accident.

In the UK, forklift training is carried out by a number of different voluntary standard training organisations, They can be directly recognised by the HSE who have formed a new organisation known as "Accrediting Body Association Work place transport 2012". In all cases qualified forklift instructors must be registered with at least one of the voluntary training organisations. Although RTITB operators are registered on a database which has to be a 3 yearly basis, the amount of time determined between refresher courses is subject to the H&S Executive, Insurance companies or company policies. The H&S Executive (HSG136 Workplace Transport Safety) does recommend re-training or testing every three to five years.

Forklift instructors throughout the UK tend to operate either as small independent training companies or as a part of a larger training provider. Training is delivered in one of two ways: on-site (sometimes referred to as in-house training), where training is delivered to a clients' premises making use of their own equipment, or off-site (public courses) at a training centre. Training centres offer the opportunity for the unemployed with little or no forklift operating experience to achieve a certificate of competence and increase their employment opportunities. Training certification standards at schools tend to follow closely the standard required by their individual Training Standards Accrediting Body to which they are affiliated. It is not unusual for a Training school to be registered with more than one body at any one time.

The British Industrial Truck Association (BITA) categorises the different forklift truck types into groups and assigned a unique identifier to each classification. Known as the "BITA List", it has become accepted as a standard in the UK. Forklift training certificates display the appropriate BITA classification to clearly identify the confines of the certification.

Forklift training in Australia
Prior to 2011, all states and territories of Australia independently regulated occupational health and safety in that state, including forklift licensing. Whilst the Occupational Health and Safety laws of the different states were based on similar underlying principles, there were differences between the various jurisdictions in the detail and application of those Occupational Health and Safety laws.

In 2008 the Inter-Governmental Agreement for Regulatory and Operational Reform in Occupational Health and Safety was formed between the Commonwealth of Australia and the six states and two territories of Australia to formalize cooperation between these jurisdictions on the harmonization of Occupational Health and Safety legislation. As a result, the national Model Work Health and Safety Act (WHS) was enacted following a review of work health and safety laws across Australia; said review involved significant public consultations effort. This act was finalized in June 2011.

This act formed a framework for the individual jurisdictions to enact supporting legislation, as the individual jurisdictions are tasked with managing State and Territory Occupational Health and Safety laws, including the issue of licences coming under the legislation. Each individual state and territory issue licences in their own jurisdiction, including what is known as "high-risk work licences" for high-risk work. Forklift licences are classed as "high-risk work licences".

To obtain a forklift licence in any state or territory an applicant must undertake a training course with an approved training organisation and then, on completion of the course, apply to the appropriate state or territory for a forklift licence. The unit of competence is known as the National High Risk Licence Unit of Competence TLILIC2001Licence to Operate a Forklift Truck, or in the case of an LO licence Unit of Competence TLILIC2002Licence to Operate an Order Picking Forklift Truck. There is a fee attached which varies from jurisdiction to jurisdiction.

Forklift licences issued in one jurisdiction are recognized in all. Licence cancellation in one jurisdiction is also recognized in all.

Forklift training in New Zealand
Forklift operator training is divided into two types:
 Operator's certificate (previously OSH certificate), to operate a forklift in a private yard or area.
 Forklift (F) driver licence endorsement, to drive a forklift on public roads.

The operator's certificate is based on the Approved Code of Practice for Training Operators and Instructors of Powered Industrial Lift Trucks ('ACOP') published in 1995 by the then Department of Labour. It gives permission for operators to operate a forklift in an enclosed space (i.e. a space not considered to be a 'road').

To use a forklift on a public road, the operator must obtain a forklift (F) endorsement on their driver licence. Operators with a class 1 (car) licence and an F endorsement may only operate forklifts up to 18,000 kg gross laden weight, while those holding a class 2 (medium rigid) licence and an F endorsement can operate a forklift of any gross laden weight.

The ACOP is a set of best practices, guidelines and recommendations for training a forklift operator. However, training can be tailored to the operator's specific needs and the attachments they use, as required under the Health and Safety at Work Act 2015.

Training consists of a theory session delivered in-person or online followed by a brief practical assessment of 15–20 minutes. If the ACOP guidelines are followed this consists of stacking and destacking pallets at low, medium and high levels, as well as driving forwards and in reverse around a coned figure-of-eight while carrying a load.

Unit standards
Unit standards are available for forklift training but are not required. The primary unit standard is US10851.

Attachments
The ACOP deals specifically with a forklift operator using only the standard forks. Forklift attachments, such as barrel clamps, fork extensions, rotators and personnel cages are covered under a separate unit standard (US10852). It is not mandatory to achieve a unit standard; a company can simply induct the operator on the attachments used.

Safety products
A number of products can be found on the market today to reduce occupational hazards caused by forklifts.

Pedestrian detection systems 

These are proximity sensors that detect objects and pedestrians from a few centimeters to several meters. The sensor makes the difference between a person and an object and alerts the driver without useless alarms. Based on stereovision, an algorithm analyses on real time if a person is in a blind zone of the forklift.

Ultrasound radars 
Ultrasonic sensors are proximity sensors that detect objects at distances ranging from a few centimeters to several meters. The sensor beeps and measures the time it takes for the signal to return. It does not discriminate between people and objects. Any obstacle located behind the truck will be detected. Normally, this type of sensor is used only for detection in rear areas.

RF systems
These are devices that alert forklift drivers of the people in the forklift's vicinity. Pedestrians must carry a radio frequency device (electronic tags) which emit a signal when a truck detects them, alerting the forklift driver of their presence. It detects both in the front and at the back and it differentiates between people and the usual obstacles found in warehouses. For this reason, the driver is only alerted when there is a pedestrian near the truck.

See also
 Electrocar
 Forklift Driver Klaus – The First Day on the Job
 Hydrogen vehicle
 Non-road engine
 Pallet
 Pallet jack
 Slip sheet

References

External links

Preventing Injuries and Deaths of Workers Who Operate or Work Near Forklifts, an alert from the National Institute for Occupational Safety and Health (NIOSH)
Safety and Health Topic: Powered Industrial Trucks, from the Occupational Safety and Health Administration (OSHA)

Lifting equipment
Construction equipment

Engineering vehicles
Material-handling equipment